Dr. Mohamed Munavvar (Dhivehi: ޑރ. މުޙައްމަދު މުނައްވަރު) was born in the island of Meedhoo. He was former Attorney General of Maldives.

Dr. Munavvar's education qualifications include; Master of Laws with Honours (LL.M.), with specialization in International Law, 1985, Patrice Lumumba People's Friendship University.

Political career
Dr. Munavvar served as the attorney general of the Maldives for ten years, until 2003.

He also served as the MP of Addu constituency for a decade. He was arrested and jailed on 13 August 2004, allegedly for participating in the pro democracy uprising, also known as Black Friday. On 5 December 2004 he was charged under the article 29 of the Maldives Penal Code "Acts against the State". The charge carries a sentence of imprisonment for life or exile for life or imprisonment or exile for a period between ten years and fifteen years. The opposition and the international community alleged that the charges were politically motivated and subsequently the charges were dropped by the government on 10 December 2004.

Political parties were not allowed to operate in the Maldives previously, but political dissidents of Gayoom's government formed MDP and Munavvar worked closely with them. On 2 June 2007 Dr.Munavvar was elected as the president of MDP, then the largest opposition party in the Maldives. On 13 August 2008 Dr.Munavvar resigned from MDP presidency.

References

Maldivian lawyers
Members of the People's Majlis
Maldivian Muslims
Living people
Attorneys General of the Maldives
Government ministers of the Maldives
Maldivian Democratic Party politicians
People from Malé
Peoples' Friendship University of Russia alumni
Year of birth missing (living people)